Municipal Building, also known as Old Bluefield Municipal Building, is a historic municipal building located at Bluefield, Mercer County, West Virginia.  It was built in 1924, and is a two- to three-story, steel and reinforced concrete Classical Revival-style building.  It features a three-story high pedimented central pavilion with four engaged Ionic order columns.  In 1977, the city government of Bluefield moved to its new building.

It was listed on the National Register of Historic Places in 1979.  It is located in the Bluefield Downtown Commercial Historic District, established in 1987.

References

Buildings and structures in Bluefield, West Virginia
City halls in West Virginia
Neoclassical architecture in West Virginia
Government buildings completed in 1924
City and town halls on the National Register of Historic Places in West Virginia
National Register of Historic Places in Mercer County, West Virginia
Individually listed contributing properties to historic districts on the National Register in West Virginia